Pădureni is a commune in Vaslui County, Western Moldavia, Romania. It is composed of eight villages: Căpotești, Davidești, Ivănești, Leoști, Pădureni, Rusca, Todireni and Văleni.

References

Communes in Vaslui County
Localities in Western Moldavia